Hermonia Vivarini (16th-century), was a Venetian glass artist.  

She was born to the glass artist Alvise Vivarini of Murano. 

On 22 May 1521, she was granted a ten-year-long patent and privilege to manufacture a glass pitcher shaped as a ship of her own design (navicella). It was uncommon for women to be granted a privilege from the famous glass guild of Murano. She was a successful artist, and her ship-shaped pitcher design became popular and was copied by many contemporary artists.

References 

 

Italian glass artists
Women glass artists
16th-century Venetian people
16th-century Italian women artists
16th-century Venetian women
Republic of Venice artists